Markhvor (also Romanized as Mārkhvor; also known as Mārkhor) is a village in Jalalvand Rural District, Firuzabad District, Kermanshah County, Kermanshah Province, Iran. At the 2006 census, its population was 79, in 14 families.

References 

Populated places in Kermanshah County